Kodiyil Oruvan is a 2021 Indian Tamil-language political thriller film directed by Ananda Krishnan and produced by Infiniti Film Ventures and Chendur Film International. It stars Vijay Antony and Aathmika.  Vijay Antony also edited the film while the music is composed by Nivas K. Prasanna. The film was released on 17 September 2021. This film received mixed reviews upon its release, praising Vijay Antony's performance, the music and action sequences, but was criticized on the screenplay and predictable storyline.

Cast

Production 
The shooting was wrapped in February 2021.

Soundtrack 
The soundtrack and score is composed by Nivas K. Prasanna. The soundtrack album featured five songs and the audio rights were acquired by Saregama.

Release 
The film was released in theatres on 17 September 2021. The film was dubbed and released in Kannada, Telugu and Hindi versions under the title Vijaya Raghavan while the Malayalam dubbed version retained the same title as the original. The streaming rights were acquired by Amazon Prime Video.

Reception 
Sify rated the film with 3/5 stars, stating that "Kodiyil Oruvan is a mass action entertainer from Vijay Antony on the lines of Pichaikkaran with strong mother sentiment." Suganth of The Times of India gave a rating of 3 out on 5 and wrote, " An uneven masala movie saved by strong amma sentiment." Haricharan Pudipeddi of Hindustan Times wrote, "Director Ananda Krishnan's first big-budget film is a predictable but entertaining political thriller." Srivatsan S of The Hindu stated that, "The Vijay Antony-starrer is loud, mostly boring and has a soft-spoken, kind-hearted hero at the centre, who seemed to have been written not on a white paper, but on tile." Navein Darshan of The New Indian Express wrote, "Kodiyil Oruvan is an unabashed commercial entertainer, and no surprise, the hero wins. Making this format click with the audience is quite tricky." Behindwoods rated the film with 2.5/5 stars, stating that "There are few lacklustre performances that pull down the film's effectiveness. The writing could have been more solid, but despite all this, the film tries to entertain you well throughout. A decent watch for the weekend. Vijay Antony's Kodiyil Oruvan is a watchable commercial drama that is high on emotions and sentiments."

Sequel
A sequel of the film is also being planned.

References

External links 
 

2020s Tamil-language films
Indian political films
Political action films